Vittorio Mero (21 May 1974 – 23 January 2002) was an Italian footballer who played as a defender. He spent his whole career in Italy playing for lower and high division clubs such as A.S. Casale Calcio, Parma F.C., Crevalcore, Ravenna Calcio, Brescia Calcio and Ternana Calcio.

Career
Born at Vercelli, he started his career with an amateur team, Belvedere in 1990–91, and made his debut at the professional level at the age of 17 for A.S. Casale Calcio. The following year Mero signed for Parma F.C., playing with the Primavera team before being sold to Crevalcore, with whom he won the Serie C2 league. In 1995, he was signed by Ravenna, team for which he played three seasons, obtaining a promotion to Serie B. He moved to Brescia in 1998, obtaining his first promotion to Serie A and making his European debut as team captain in the 2001 UEFA Intertoto Cup, in which Brescia reached the finals, eventually losing to Paris Saint-Germain. During his time there, he was nicknamed Sceriffo (Sheriff) by his coach Nedo Sonetti for his diligence and reliability.

Death
Mero died on 23 January 2002, in a car accident in the A4 highway near Rovato. Brescia honoured him by retiring the #13 jersey.

Honours
Crevalcore
Serie C2/A: 1993–94

See also
Retired numbers in association football

References

1974 births
2002 deaths
People from Vercelli
Italian footballers
Brescia Calcio players
Casale F.B.C. players
Parma Calcio 1913 players
Ravenna F.C. players
Ternana Calcio players
Association football defenders
Serie A players
Serie B players
Road incident deaths in Italy
Footballers from Piedmont
Sportspeople from the Province of Vercelli